Futebol Clube Cascavel, more commonly referred to as FC Cascavel, is a Brazilian professional association football club in Cascavel, Paraná which currently plays in Série D, the fourth tier of Brazilian football, as well as in the Campeonato Paranaense, the top division of the Paraná state football league.

History
The club was founded on 16 January 2008. by the footballer Juliano Haus Belletti. They finished in the second position in the Campeonato Paranaense Third Level in 2009, losing the competition to Pato Branco.

Stadium

FC Cascavel play their home games at Estádio Olímpico Regional Arnaldo Busatto. The stadium has a maximum capacity of 28,125 people.

References

Association football clubs established in 2008
Football clubs in Paraná (state)
2008 establishments in Brazil